Tim Bartels (born 31 January 1988 in Schönebeck) is a German rower.

References

External links
 

1988 births
Living people
German male rowers
World Rowing Championships medalists for Germany
European Rowing Championships medalists
People from Schönebeck
Sportspeople from Saxony-Anhalt
21st-century German people